The End of the World is a Big Finish Productions audio drama featuring Stephen Fewell as Jason Kane, a character from the spin-off media based on the long-running British science fiction television series Doctor Who.

Plot 
Jason Kane is on a quest to finally discover the truth about Irving Braxiatel. What he discovers will change the lives of everyone around him forever.

Cast
Jason Kane - Stephen Fewell
Bernice Summerfield - Lisa Bowerman
Azagrazar - Paul Chahidi
Peter - Thomas Grant
Mira - Caroline Lennon
Adrian - Harry Myers
Braxiatel - Miles Richardson

External links
Big Finish Productions - Professor Bernice Summerfield: The End of the World

Bernice Summerfield audio plays